Tamo Mibang (1 July 1955 – 6 August 2022) was an Indian professor, Pro Chancellor of APEX Professional University and Vice Chancellor of Rajiv Gandhi University in Doimukh, Arunachal Pradesh. He was from the Adi Tribe of Arunachal Pradesh, and sought to promote literacy in the state.

Select works
Social Change in Arunachal Pradesh
Tribal Studies - Emerging Frontiers of Knowledge
An introduction to Adi language
Tribal Villages in Arunachal Pradesh
Marriage in tribal societies'''Dynamics of tribal villages in Arunachal Pradesh: emerging realitiesSocial Change in Arunachal Pradesh: The Minyongs, 1947-1981Folk Tales of North East India: Adis of Arunachal Pradesh''.

References

1955 births
2022 deaths
Writers from Arunachal Pradesh
People from Adi Community
Heads of universities and colleges in India